Mr. Mike's Mondo Video is a 1979 American comedy film conceived and directed by Saturday Night Live writer/featured player Michael O'Donoghue. It is a spoof of the controversial 1962 documentary Mondo Cane, showing people doing weird stunts (the logo for Mr. Mike's Mondo Video copies the original Mondo Cane logo). Many cast members of Saturday Night Live, including  Dan Aykroyd, Jane Curtin, Laraine Newman, Bill Murray, Don Novello and Gilda Radner, appear in Mr. Mike's Mondo Video. People who had previously hosted SNL, or would go on to host (such as Carrie Fisher, Margot Kidder and Teri Garr) make cameo appearances in the film. Others who appear in the film include musicians Sid Vicious, Paul Shaffer, Debbie Harry, Root Boy Slim, and Klaus Nomi; artist Robert Delford Brown; and model Patty Oja.

History
Mr. Mike's Mondo Video was originally produced on videotape as an NBC television special that would have aired in place of Saturday Night Live during one of its live breaks. Because of the special's vulgar and tasteless content, NBC declared that it did not meet the network's programming standards and shelved it. Shortly thereafter, O'Donoghue met former NBC programming head Paul Klein at a party where the project was discussed; Klein was inspired to make a deal with NBC to pay the network the $300,000 it cost to produce the show in exchange for the rights to release it to movie theaters. The show was transferred from videotape to 35mm film for the release.

To pad the program to feature length, filmmaker Walter Williams created a special Mr. Bill Show episode, combining footage from his past Mr. Bill shorts from SNL with new wraparound scenes, to present at the head of the film as a short subject.  Co-writer Mitchell Glazer states in the DVD's audio commentary that many other scenes were added to pad the film's runtime to the required 90 minutes for theatrical releases.

The film would eventually be seen on television, albeit on pay cable and syndication, with several cuts, such as the non–sequitur "Dream Sequences".

Mr. Mike's Mondo Video was released on home video in the early 1980s through Mike Nesmith's Pacific Arts label. In January 2009, The film was released on DVD by Shout! Factory.  The DVD and video tape releases mute the infamous "My Way" segment (see below), and removes Mr. Mike's lead-in to the "Church of the Jack Lord" segment due to the inability of Shout! Factory to get the rights to use the Hawaii Five-O theme song.

Plot
The film is largely plotless; a series of vignettes linked together by interstitial pieces featuring Mr. Mike discussing how upsetting and odd the sequences are. He introduces some of the pieces via voiceover, and some open with no introduction.

Sequences include:
 Aykroyd displaying his webbed toes which he prodded with a screwdriver to prove they were not make-up.
 A church that worships Jack Lord as the one true god (also featuring Dan Aykroyd).
 A French restaurant that prides itself on how poorly it treats American patrons.
 A sequence where the movie's "guide" takes viewers on a tour of an Amsterdam-based school that teaches cats how to swim, so they won't drown in the city's many canals.
 Several of the regular SNL female cast members at the time, including Jane Curtin and Gilda Radner, listing a wide variety of disgusting things men can do that would turn them on, including having "a full, firm colostomy bag".
 "Dream Sequence" — a series of surreal film pieces bracketed by large light-up signs reading "Dream Sequence" and "End Dream Sequence" that track towards and away from the camera. One of these is merely performance footage of Klaus Nomi, while another features home movie footage shot by Emily Prager intercut with stop-motion animation.
 Jo Jo, The Human Hot Plate — a quick cutaway to performance artist Robert Delford Brown, smiling, undulating and dressed only in a pair of briefs while holding canned spaghetti in his cupped hands.
 The presentation of a classified government weapons project, "Laserbra 2000".  This piece is the last of a triptych of sequences that chronicle attempts to obtain the classified footage. In the first, the film (secreted in a violin case) is in fact someone's home movies; in the second, the violin case contains a violin. National Lampoon writer Brian McConnachie appears in the footage as a scientist.
Short films made by other directors:
 "Cleavage" by Mitchell Kriegman — closeup of a hand working its way out from (what is implied to be) between a large pair of breasts, feeling around gently, realizing where it was, and working its way back in.
 "Crowd Scene Take One", by Andy Aaron and Ernie Fosselius — purports to be a director guiding background actors for a disaster movie scene.
 "Uncle Si and the Sirens" — anonymously-directed silent-era "nudie-cutie" short found by SNL alumnus Tom Schiller.

Music 
Mondo Cane features the hit song "More" (which was initially an instrumental song with words added later), sung by crooner Julius La Rosa. In Mr. Mike's Mondo Video, O'Donoghue and writer Emily Prager (who also act in the film) take the instrumental song "Telstar" by Joe Meek and add lyrics to it, creating "The Haunting Theme Song",  also sung by La Rosa. The song is sung in English during the opening credits, and in nonsense Italian over the closing credits.

Sid Vicious appearance
Mondo Video features Sid Vicious performing the classic song "My Way" from The Great Rock 'n' Roll Swindle, which had not yet been released in America at the time.  On the initial Pacific Arts home video release, the audio is muted before Vicious begins singing.  A crawl appears onscreen explaining that the owners of the song's copyright would not permit audio of the performance to be included on the tape: "It wasn't a case of money", the crawl explains, "they wouldn't even discuss it."  The sound returns when the performance switches to a heavy punk rock guitar riff, and Sid pulling out a gun, firing (presumably blanks) into the audience, flipping them the bird, and walking off.

The muted audio and explanatory crawl are carried over on the 2009 Shout! Factory release, despite the fact that the Sid Vicious version of the song can be seen and heard, in its entirety, in the DVD release of The Great Rock'n'Roll Swindle, also released by Shout! Factory.

Reception
Vincent Canby of The New York Times wrote that the "most depressing thing" about the film "is that there are beginnings of funny sketches all over the place but they've been abandoned before anything was done with them." Variety wrote that the film "pretty much confines itself to the sicker, more offensive end of the 'Saturday Night Live' spectrum, though with far less humorous payoff than the latter regularly delivers." Gene Siskel of the Chicago Tribune gave the film one star out of four and called the humor "sick and stupid," declaring that it was "one case in which the television network is right, and the embattled performer is wrong. Truly wrong." Linda Gross wrote that the film "feeds off television and mocks all that is middle-aged and middle-American. Its own methods are sophomoric and tacky. Rated R, it's full of bad taste, but it doesn't deliver its promised raunchiness." Gary Arnold of The Washington Post wrote, "If you think that censors are always wrong, this show could change your mind. O'Donoghue doesn't give offense by being obscenely funny. He gives offense by being obscenely pointless, tasteless and mean."

References

External links

 Bloch, Mark. The First Saturday Night Live Movie: Robert Delford Brown is “Jo Jo, The Human Hot Plate” in Mr. Mike’s Mondo Video. (from Robert Delford Brown: Meat, Maps and Militant Metaphysics, Cameron Art Museum, Wilmington, North Carolina, 2008. , .

1979 films
1970s English-language films
Saturday Night Live films
Films with screenplays by Michael O'Donoghue
Films with screenplays by Mitch Glazer
Saturday Night Live in the 1970s
American parody films
1970s American films